These are the Billboard magazine number-one albums of 1992, per the Billboard 200.

Chart history

See also
1992 in music

References

1992
United States albums